Freshpet is an American pet food company. Its cat food and dog food products are marketed as fresh, and need to be kept refrigerated. It is listed on the Nasdaq exchange with the ticker symbol FRPT.

History 

Freshpet was founded in Secaucus, New Jersey, in 2006 by Scott Morris, Cathal Walsh, and John Phelps, former pet food executives. It opened a factory in Quakertown, Pennsylvania, in 2006; and another in Bethlehem, Pennsylvania in 2013.

Freshpet went public on the NASDAQ in November 2014, raising $164 million in its IPO. with a market capitalization of $447 million.

In February 2020, the company was offered a grant of $2.1 million from the Texas Enterprise Fund to build a plant in Ennis, Texas.  Also 

In 2020, the company reported revenue of almost $319 million, an increase of some 30%, and a net income loss of $3.19 million, up 130% on the previous year. It also reported losses in the four preceding years.

Products 
Freshpet's cat food and dog food products are marketed as fresh, requiring refrigeration since the company's products have no preservatives. Freshpet was the first to distribute pet food in the fresh and refrigerated category across North America. After a 2007 crisis of wet and dried dog food tainted by melamine, Freshpet's uncontaminated fresh food products experienced rapid growth in the number of stores carrying them. 

As of 2021, the company's pet-food brands include Freshpet, Dog Joy, DogNation, Spring & Sprout, Vital, Homestyle Creations, and Nature's Fresh.

References

Further reading
 NJ.com - "Paw Print: Pet food company steps up to the plate"
 South Charlotte Weekly – "Culinary Corner: Canine Cuisine"

External links
 

Companies based in Hudson County, New Jersey
Cat food brands
Dog food brands
Companies listed on the Nasdaq
2014 initial public offerings
American companies established in 2006